Nationality words link to articles with information on the nation's poetry or literature (for instance, Irish or France).

Events

Works published

 Resalat Al-Ghufran by Al-Ma'arri

Births
Death years link to the corresponding "[year] in poetry" article. There are conflicting or unreliable sources for the birth years of many people born in this period; where sources conflict, the poet is listed again and the conflict is noted:

1031:
 Muhammad ibn Ammar (died 1086), Arabic poet in Al-Andalus

1037:
 Su Shi (died 1101), major poet of the Song Dynasty

1038:
 Isaac ibn Ghiyyat (died 1089), a Hebrew poet in al-Andalus

Deaths
Birth years link to the corresponding "[year] in poetry" article:

1037:
 Farrukhi Sistani (born unknown), Persian poet

See also

 Poetry
 11th century in poetry
 11th century in literature
 List of years in poetry

Other events:
 Other events of the 12th century
 Other events of the 13th century

11th century:
 11th century in poetry
 11th century in literature

Notes

11th-century poetry
Poetry